Saskatchewan Grain Car Corporation  was a Canadian crown corporation owned by the Government of Saskatchewan established on October 2, 1979 to purchase and rent grain rail cars for the transportation of statutory grains between Saskatchewan and export ports. The corporation was governed by the Saskatchewan Grain Car Corporation Act.  In 1990 the government invested $55M in the corporation for the purchase of 1,000 new covered rail cars.  Priority in the rental of rail cars was given to short-line operators in the province.  In March of 2017, the Government of Saskatchewan announced that it would be selling off nearly 1,000 hopper cars as the Saskatchewan Grain Car Corporation was going to be wound down.

Car design

Older rail cars were obtained from Canadian Pacific Railway and Canadian National Railway when the corporation was established, these were replaced by newly built cars in 1981.

Between February and October 1981 these were replaced with 1,000 newly built steel rail cars, lined with epoxy, manufactured by Hawker Siddeley Canada.  Each car has a capacity of 128.8 cubic metres (4548.5 cubic feet).  Approximately 906 cars remain in service with 417 allocated to Canadian National and 489 allocated to Canadian Pacific. Approximately 800 cars are in the original brown and orange paint scheme.  In 2007 110 cars were repaired by GE Rail Car Repair Services Company in Regina.  The new paint scheme is green with the type Saskatchewan!.

Models of the rail cars are sold by North American Railcar Corporation.

References

External links
  Saskatchewan Grain Car Corporation

Saskatchewan railways
Crown corporations of Saskatchewan
Companies based in Regina, Saskatchewan
Rolling stock leasing companies
Grain trade